Theodora Sarah Orne Jewett (September 3, 1849 – June 24, 1909) was an American novelist, short story writer and poet, best known for her local color works set along or near the southern coast of Maine. Jewett is recognized as an important practitioner of American literary regionalism.

Early life
Sarah Orne Jewett was born in South Berwick, Maine on September 3, 1849. Her family had been residents of New England for many generations.
 
Jewett's father, Theodore Herman Jewett, was a doctor specializing in "obstetrics and diseases of women and children," and Jewett often accompanied him on his rounds, becoming acquainted with the sights and sounds of her native land and its people. Her mother was Caroline Frances (Perry). As treatment for rheumatoid arthritis, a condition that developed in her early childhood, Jewett was sent on frequent walks and through them also developed a love of nature. In later life, Jewett often visited Boston, where she was acquainted with many of the most influential literary figures of her day; but she always returned to South Berwick, small seaports near which were the inspiration for the towns of "Deephaven" and "Dunnet Landing" in her stories.

Jewett was educated at Miss Olive Rayne's school and then at Berwick Academy, graduating in 1866. She supplemented her education with reading in her extensive family library. Jewett was "never overtly religious", but after she joined the Episcopal church in 1871, she explored less conventional religious ideas. For example, her friendship with Harvard law professor Theophilus Parsons stimulated an interest in the teachings of Emanuel Swedenborg, an eighteenth-century Swedish scientist and theologian, who believed that the Divine "was present in innumerable, joined forms — a concept underlying Jewett's belief in individual responsibility."

Career

In 1868 at age 19, Jewett published her first important story, "Jenny Garrow's Lovers," in the Atlantic Monthly, and her reputation grew throughout the 1870s and 1880s. Jewett used the pen name "Alice Eliot" or "A. C. Eliot" for her early stories. Her literary importance arises from her careful, if subdued, vignettes of country life that reflect a contemporary interest in local color rather than in plot. Jewett possessed a keen descriptive gift that William Dean Howells called "an uncommon feeling for talk — I hear your people." Jewett made her reputation with the novella The Country of the Pointed Firs (1896). A Country Doctor (1884), a novel reflecting her father and her early ambitions for a medical career, and A White Heron (1886), a collection of short stories that are among her finest work. Some of Jewett's poetry was collected in Verses (1916), and she also wrote three children's books. Willa Cather described Jewett as a significant influence on her development as a writer, and "feminist critics have since championed her writing for its rich account of women's lives and voices." Cather dedicated her 1913 novel O Pioneers!, based upon memories of her childhood in Nebraska, to Jewett. In 1901 Bowdoin College conferred an honorary doctorate of literature on Jewett, the first woman to be granted an honorary degree by Bowdoin. In Jewett's obituary in 1909, The Boston Globe remarked on the strength that lay in "the detail of her work, in fine touches, in simplicity."

Personal life
 Jewett's works featuring relationships between women often mirrored her own life and friendships. Jewett's letters and diaries reveal that as a young woman, Jewett had close relationships with several women, including Grace Gordon, Kate Birckhead, Georgie Halliburton, Ella Walworth, and Ellen Mason. For instance, from evidence in her diary, Jewett appears to have had an intense crush on Kate Birckhead. Jewett later established a close friendship with writer Annie Adams Fields (1834–1915) and her husband, publisher James T. Fields, editor of the Atlantic Monthly. After the sudden death of James Fields in 1881, Jewett and Annie Fields lived openly together for the rest of Jewett's life in what was then termed a "Boston marriage" in Fields's homes in Manchester-by-the-Sea, MA, and at 148 Charles Street in Boston. Some modern scholars believe the two were lovers. Both women "found friendship, humor, and literary encouragement" in one another's company, traveling to Europe together and hosting "American and European literati."  In France Jewett met Thérèse Blanc-Bentzon with whom she had long corresponded and who translated some of her stories for publication in France. Jewett's poetry, much of it unpublished, includes approximately thirty love poems or fragments of poems written to women which illustrate the intensity of her feelings toward them. Jewett also wrote about romantic attachments between women in her novel Deephaven (1877) and in her short story "Martha's Lady" (1897).

On September 3, 1902, Jewett was injured in a carriage accident that all but ended her writing career. She was paralyzed by a stroke in March 1909, and she died in her South Berwick home after suffering another stroke on June 24, 1909.

Jewett House
The Sarah Orne Jewett House, the Georgian home of the Jewett family, built in 1774 and overlooking Central Square at South Berwick, is a National Historic Landmark and Historic New England museum. Jewett and her sister Mary inherited the house in 1887.

Selected works

 Deephaven, James R. Osgood, 1877
 Play Days, Houghton, Osgood, 1878
 Old Friends and New, Houghton, Osgood, 1879
 Country By-Ways, Houghton-Mifflin, 1881
 A Country Doctor, Houghton-Mifflin, 1884
The Mate of the Daylight, and Friends Ashore, Houghton-Mifflin, 1884
 A Marsh Island, Houghton-Mifflin, 1885
 A White Heron and Other Stories, Houghton-Mifflin, 1886
 The Story of the Normans, Told Chiefly in Relation to Their Conquest of England, G.P. Putnam's Sons, 1887
 The King of Folly Island and Other People, Houghton-Mifflin, 1888
 Tales of New England, Houghton-Mifflin, 1890
 Betty Leicester: A Story for Girls, Houghton-Mifflin, 1890
 Strangers and Wayfarers, Houghton-Mifflin, 1890
 A Native of Winby and Other Tales, Houghton-Mifflin, 1893
 Betty Leicester's English Christmas: A New Chapter of an Old Story, privately printed for the Bryn Mawr School, 1894
 The Life of Nancy, Houghton-Mifflin, 1895
 The Country of the Pointed Firs, Houghton-Mifflin, 1896
 The Queen's Twin and Other Stories, Houghton-Mifflin, 1899
 The Tory Lover, Houghton-Mifflin, 1901
An Empty Purse: A Christmas Story, privately printed, 1905

Reference in popular culture 

The 2019 film The Lighthouse based the down-east accent of character Thomas Wake (played by Willem Dafoe) on Jewett's phonetic transcription of period speech in southern Maine.

American-British author Henry James was inspired by Annie Fields and Sarah Orne Jewett's relationship when writing his 1866 novel The Bostonians.

References

Further reading
 Bell, Michael Davitt, ed. Sarah Orne Jewett, Novels and Stories (Library of America, 1994) 

 Blanchard, Paula.  Sarah Orne Jewett: Her World and Her Work (Addison-Wesley, 1994) 
 Church, Joseph.  Transcendent Daughters in Jewett's Country of the Pointed Firs (Fairleigh Dickinson UP, 1994) 
 Renza, Louis A. "A White Heron" and The Question of Minor Literature (University of Wisconsin Press, 1985) 
 Sherman, Sarah W. Sarah Orne Jewett, an American Persephone (University Press of New England, 1989)

External links

 
 
 
 
 
 The Sarah Orne Jewett Text Project
 The Country of Pointed Firs at Bartleby.com
 Sarah Orne Jewett's Literature Online
 PAL
 Index entry for Sarah Orne Jewett at Poet's Corner
 Sarah Orne Jewett House Museum, South Berwick, Maine
 Sarah Orne Jewett's "A White Heron"
Letters of Sarah Orne Jewett
 
Sarah Orne Jewett at the Boston Athenaeum
Out of the Archives: Someone Will Remember Us: Decoding 19th Century Queer Literature, The History Project Documenting LGBTQ Boston, Sept 11, 2020
 Finding aid to Sarah Orne Jewett letters at Columbia University. Rare Book & Manuscript Library.

1849 births
1909 deaths
19th-century American novelists
20th-century American novelists
19th-century American women writers
20th-century American women writers
19th-century American short story writers
20th-century American short story writers
Converts to Anglicanism
Gilman family of New Hampshire
American women short story writers
Novelists from Maine
People from South Berwick, Maine
American women novelists
Berwick Academy (Maine) alumni